Deltophora fasciella is a moth of the family Gelechiidae. It is found in Israel, south-western Saudi Arabia, southern Iran, eastern Afghanistan and possibly Sudan.

The length of the forewings is 5-6.5 mm. The forewings are pale whitish brown with dark markings. Adults have been recorded on wing in April, May and November.

References

Moths described in 1979
Deltophora
Taxa named by Klaus Sattler